Carvin may refer to the following:

Places
Carvin, a French commune
Carvin Creek Homesites, California, an unincorporated community

People
Carvin (name)

Companies
Carvin Corporation, a guitar amplifier and pro audio manufacturer
Carvin & Ivan (Karma Productions), a music producer
Kiesel Guitars, a guitar manufacturer that sells the brand Carvin Guitars